The 2020 Erovnuli Liga or Crystalbet Erovnuli Liga 2020 (formerly known as Umaglesi Liga) was the 32nd season of top-tier football in Georgia. Dinamo Tbilisi were the defending champions. The season began on 29 February 2020 and ended on 10 December 2020. The league winner, Dinamo Tbilisi, earned a place in the UEFA Champions League and the second and third-placed clubs, Dinamo Batumi and Dila Gori respectively, earned a place in the new UEFA Europa Conference League.

In March the season was suspended following a decision by the Georgian Football Federation due to COVID-19 pandemic, initially until 1 April, but later the suspension was extended to late June. Each team played 18 matches instead of the planned 36.

Teams and stadiums

League table

Results
Each team will play the other nine teams home and away, for a total of 18 games each.

Relegation play-offs

Season statistics

Top scorers

References

Erovnuli Liga seasons
1
Georgia
Georgia
Erovnuli Liga, 2020